"Old Santeclaus with Much Delight" is an anonymous illustrated children's poem published in New York in 1821, predating by two years the first publication of A Visit from St. Nicholas (Twas the Night before Christmas).  It is the first publication to mention (and illustrate) Santa Claus's reindeer and his sleigh, as well as being the first to describe his arrival on Christmas Eve. The accompanying illustrations are the earliest published artistic depictions of a Santa Claus figure.

Publication

The poem, with eight colored engraved illustrations, was published in New York by William B. Gilley in 1821 as a small paperback book entitled The Children's Friend: A New-Year's Present, to the Little Ones from Five to Twelve. The names of the author and the illustrator are not known. The illustrations were reproduced lithographically, the first instance of lithography in the United States.

Published in the same city as Washington Irving's earlier portrait of Santa Claus in Knickerbocker's History of New York, the poem may have directly inspired another New Yorker, Clement Clarke Moore, to create the modern Santa in "'Twas the Night before Christmas".

Development of the Santa Claus figure

Gilley's book includes some important elements in the early development of Santa Claus: his connection with the northern winter, the reindeer and sleigh, and his arrival on Christmas Eve rather than on 6 December (the traditional feast day of Saint Nicholas).

The accompanying engravings are the earliest images of a Santa figure. They show Santeclaus dressed in a red outfit and are the first reference to his being dressed in that color. Although red had been traditionally associated with bishop's robes, such as those that Saint Nicholas might have worn, the outfit shown is not that of a bishop, nor does it represent the old Dutch clothing of Saint Nicholas as described by Washington Irving and James Kirke Paulding.

Santeclaus brings presents only for "good" children, and in the first illustration they are explicitly called "rewards". "Naughty" children receive a "long, black, birchen rod" whose use for parental punishment is endorsed as a "command of God".

The poem

Gallery

See also
 List of Christmas-themed literature

References

External links

 
 

Santa Claus in fiction
Christmas in the United States
19th-century engravings
1821 poems
Works of unknown authorship
Works published anonymously
Children's poems
Santa Claus's reindeer